WCMO (98.5 FM) is a low-power (4-watt) student-operated radio station at Marietta College, in the United States. The station serves the Marietta, Ohio area.  WCMO broadcasts many of the sporting events at Marietta College.  The station is owned and operated by the college.

References

External links

CMO